Nueve de Julio is a city in Buenos Aires Province. It is named for the date of Argentina's Independence Day. It also gives its name to the administrative division of Nueve de Julio Partido. Its UN/LOCODE is AREJO.

Climate

Notable people 

 Fanne Foxe, exotic dancer involved in a sex scandal with Wilbur Mills

References

External links

Populated places in Buenos Aires Province
Cities in Argentina
Argentina